Fantasmagorie is an album by Akurat, released on May 31, 2006.

Track listing
 "Tylko najwięksi"
 "Fantasmagorie"
 "Słowa mają mnie"
 "Kiedy wrócę tu"
 "Demo"
 "Sama śmietanka"
 "Szerzej"
 "Garb"
 "Kiedy bliżej z tobą będę"
 "Jeden człowiek to jeden sens"
 "Pracuję"
 "Łan"
 "Czy to już"

Singles
 "Fantasmagorie"

Credits
 Łukasz Gocal – drums
 Ireneusz Wojnar – bass
 Tomasz Kłaptocz – vocals, trumpet
 Piotr Wróbel – guitar, vocals
 Wojciech Żółty – guitar, vocals
 Przemysław Zwias – saxophone, flute

References

Akurat albums
2006 albums